Kiss of Death is a 1916 Swedish silent drama film directed by Victor Sjöström. Approximately 30 minutes of the film survives in the Cinémathèque Française film archive.

Plot summary

Cast
 Victor Sjöström as Överingenjör Weyler / Ingenjör Lebel
 Albin Lavén as Dr. Monro
 Mathias Taube as Doctor Adell
 Wanda Rothgardt
 Jenny Tschernichin-Larsson as Anna Harper

See also
 List of incomplete or partially lost films

References

External links
 
 
 

1916 films
1910s Swedish-language films
Swedish black-and-white films
1916 drama films
Swedish silent films
Films directed by Victor Sjöström
Swedish drama films
Silent drama films